Chen Zhihui is a Chinese actor best known for playing supporting roles in various films and television series since the 1980s. Some of his more notable roles in film include: Master Chin in Jet Li's Fearless (2006); Zhang Fei in Three Kingdoms: Resurrection of the Dragon (2008); Master Liu in Ip Man (2008).

Career
Chen is from Chengde, Hebei. In his early years, he joined a performing arts group and learnt dancing. He won an award in a national dancing competition. In 1980, he enrolled in the Hebei Medical School (now part of the Hebei Medical University). In 1986, he was accepted into the Central Academy of Drama and studied drama there.

Chen has made appearances in various films and television series since 1987. In the early 2000s, he joined the Hong Kong television network TVB for two years and acted in two TVB dramas, Blade Heart and Fight for Love.

Aside from acting, Chen also practises wushu and he specialises in Shaobei Fist.

Filmography

Film

Television

References

External links
 
 

Year of birth missing (living people)
Living people
Male actors from Hebei
Central Academy of Drama alumni
People from Chengde
Chinese wushu practitioners
TVB actors
Sportspeople from Hebei
Chinese male film actors
Chinese male television actors